Many elements of Caribbean folklore (the orally transmitted beliefs, myths, tales, and practices of a group of people) are African in origin, given that slaves brought from Africa's West (or Gold) Coast made up a large majority of those brought to the region.

Characters

Very popular in terms of Caribbean story-telling, and a direct transfer from West Africa to the Caribbean are the Anancy Stories (Nancy Stories) told throughout the region.  Ananse is the Asante word for spider. The trickster Anancy (also known as Ananci, Ananse, Anansi, Ananci Krokoko, and Brer Nancy), with his quick-witted intelligence and his knack for surviving the odds, often through trickery, is the most popular of this genre of African-Caribbean folk-tale characters, although there are other West African influences in folk story characters, including the hare (chief character in the Yoruba folktales) and the tortoise, which features in the stories of the Ibo people.

In addition to these stories, African religious figures also comprise a significant part of Caribbean folklore, many of the supernatural folklore figures possessing characteristics which are identical with those of African deities, and include:

"Papa Bois", who appears in many different forms, sometimes as a deer, or in old ragged clothes, sometimes hairy and though very old, extremely strong and muscular, with cloven hoofs and leaves growing out of his beard. As the guardian of the animals and the custodian of the trees, he is known to sound a cow's horn to warn his friends of the approach of hunters. He doesn't tolerate killing for killing's sake, and the wanton destruction of the forest.

"La Diablesse", the devil woman, is sometimes personified as an old crone, who steps forth with her cloven hoof from behind a tree on a lonely road, the sound of chains mingling with the rustle of her petticoat. Sometimes she takes the form of a beautiful woman, to lure some unsuspecting passerby to his death or perhaps to madness. Although she may appear young, she will be dressed in the ancient costume of these islands: a brilliant madras turban, chemise with half sleeves and much embroidery and lace, zepingue tremblant ("trembling pins of gold"), and all the finery of the by-gone days. Even when she appears beautiful, there is something that betrays her - she often has one hoof and a normal human foot or two hooves which she uses her long, flowing gown to hide.

"Mama Dlo" or "Mama Dglo" (known in West Africa today as Mammy Wata) whose name is derived from the French "maman de l'eau" which means "mother of the water" is akin to the mermaid figure of European folklore and represents West African water spirits and there is a spirit called a cocoya who feasts on children then eats them up - they also can change into different shapes.

The "Soucouyant", whose French-derived names comes from the word "to suck", is personified by a woman, often old, who sheds her skin at night and flies through the skies, sometimes as a ball of flame, to suck blood from her victims.

The "Ligahoo" or "Loup Garou" is a shape changer, a man who has power over nature and the capacity to change form to that of an animal. Or in Caribbean Myths the Loup-Garou is a man who made a deal with the devil, to have the ability to change form (to a werewolf) so that at night he could go around to kill without ever being caught.

Some contemporary Caribbean writers explore Afro-Caribbean folklore themes in their novels, including Nalo Hopkinson, Wayne Gerard Trotman and Marie-Elena John.

Bibliography and Further reading
 Abrahams, Roger D. (1985). African American Folktales: Stories from Black Traditions in the New World. Penguin.
 Elswit, Sharon Barcan (2017).  The Caribbean Story Finder: A Guide to 438 Tales from 24 Nations and Territories, Listing Subjects and Sources.  McFarland & Company, Inc.
 Wolkstein, Diane (1997). The Magic Orange Tree: and Other Haitian Folktales. Penguin Random House.

External links

Contemporary Writing based on Trinidad and Tobago folk characters
Contes créoles (Creole tales)
Traditions orales aux Antilles Françaises (Oral traditions in the French West Indies)

Caribbean culture
North American folklore
Folklore by country
Latin American folklore
Folklore by region